Olargues is a commune in the Hérault department in the Occitanie region in southern France. It is rated as one of the most beautiful villages in France.

Olargues is a good example of a French Medieval town. It was occupied by the Romans, the Vandals and the Visigoths.  At the end of the 11th century the Jaur valley came under the authority of the Château of the Viscount of Minerve. The following centuries saw a succession of wars and epidemics, and it was not until the 18th century that Olargues became re-established. This was due to the prosperity of local agriculture and artisanal industry.

Attractions

Pont du Diable
The "Devil's Bridge" is said to date back to 1202 and is reputed to be the scene of transactions between the people of Olargues and the "devil". The old village is clustered around the belltower, which was formerly the main tower of the castle (Romanesque construction). The old shops have marble frontages and overhanging upper storeys. A museum of popular traditions and art is to be found in the stairs of the Commanderie.

Population

See also
Communes of the Hérault department

References

Communes of Hérault
Plus Beaux Villages de France